John O'Gaunt School is a coeducational secondary school in Hungerford, Berkshire, England for students aged 11 to 16. It was Berkshire's first community school.

History
Opened in January 1963, the school is a fusion of 1960s decor and 1990s pre-fabricated buildings. The school gained Technology College status in 2003, and was renamed John O'Gaunt Community Technology College before converting to academy status and becoming John O'Gaunt School in 2012.  It is run by the Excalibur Academies Trust, a multi-academy trust which includes several local primary schools and St John's Marlborough.

Hungerford massacre 
On 19 August 1987, the school gained notoriety as the site of the denouement of the Hungerford massacre. Michael Robert Ryan made the then-empty school the site of his final stand and suicide, having killed 16 people and injured 15 others.

Sixth Form
In the first half of 2014, the school suspended their upcoming sixth form intake for September 2014 due to dwindling student numbers, and intended to suspend the 2015 intake and beyond. For changes to intakes of 3 or more years, West Berkshire Council were required to hold a statutory consultation, which resulted in the Sixth Form being closed from August 2016 onwards. West Berkshire Council have indicated that should demand increase for a sixth form at the school in the future, that consideration would be given to reopening the sixth form.

Extracurricular activities
John O'Gaunt offers mainly sports and arts events. Students who apply for a course at Newbury College are taken by bus.

Former headteachers
 Sarah Brinkley (2012–2015)
 Neil Spurdell (2009–2012)
 Lin Bartlett (1998–2008)
 Marcia Twelftree (1993–1997)
 Jeff Dawkins (1990–1993)
 Monica Darroch (1990)
 David Lee (1986–1989)
 Keith McClellan (1985–1986)
 David Lee (1975–1985)
 Norman Fox (1975)
 Rex Chesney (1963–1974)

Notable former pupils  
Adam Brown, actor, comedian and pantomime performer
 Charlie Austin, footballer for Queens Park Rangers
 Michael Robert Ryan, perpetrator of the Hungerford massacre, who also killed himself at the same school

References

External links 

 

Secondary schools in West Berkshire District
Educational institutions established in 1963
1963 establishments in England
Academies in West Berkshire District
Hungerford